The 1878 Port Chalmers by-election was a by-election held on 12 April 1878 in the  electorate during the 6th New Zealand Parliament.

The by-election was caused by the resignation of the incumbent MP William Reynolds.

The by-election was won by James Green.

he was opposed by the ex-Mayor Mr Henry Dench.

Results
The following table gives the election result (possibly missing one booth, but no later result has been found):

References

Port Chalmers, 1878
1878 elections in New Zealand
Politics of Otago
April 1878 events